The men's 4 × 400 metres relay event at the 2015 African Games was held on 16 and 17 September.

Medalists

Results

Heats
Qualification: First 3 teams of each heat (Q) plus the next 2 fastest (q) qualified for the final.

Final

References

Relay